Gaby is a 1956 drama film made by MGM. It is the third version of the 1930 play Waterloo Bridge, previously made into films Waterloo Bridge (1931) and Waterloo Bridge (1940). It is the only version of the play made in color, and the least faithful to it. The title, the names of the main characters, and plot details were all changed. Unlike the 1931 and 1940 versions, this film ends happily.

This version was directed by Curtis Bernhardt and produced by Edwin H. Knopf. The screenplay was by Albert Hackett, Frances Goodrich and Charles Lederer, based on the screenplay of Waterloo Bridge (1940) by S. N. Behrman, Paul H. Rameau and George Froeschel. All three versions were based on the play by Robert E. Sherwood.

The film stars Leslie Caron as Gaby and John Kerr with Sir Cedric Hardwicke, Taina Elg and Margalo Gillmore.

Plot
Gaby (Caron) is a ballet dancer in 1944 London who runs into corporal Gregory Wendell (Kerr) while rushing to catch the bus. Greg is mesmerized by Gaby and goes to the ballet to see her on stage, but Gaby wants nothing to do with Greg. He persists, and by the end of the day, she agrees to marry him.

Before they can marry, there is a mountain of red tape and Greg is shipped out suddenly for the D-Day landing, promising to marry her on his return. When she hears that he has been killed, Gaby becomes a prostitute as the only way to support herself (as in the 1940 film). When the report turns out to be false, and Greg returns alive, Gaby repeatedly tells him that she cannot marry him, but he is unable to guess the correct reason. When she finally tells him, he is shocked speechless for a very long time and she runs away into a bombing raid.

Greg drives after her in his father's car, then has to continue the pursuit on foot. He yells at her to "have a heart – I am crippled." Just as a V-1's engine stops, indicating an imminent explosion, he tells Gaby to duck into a doorway, saving her life. He says, "If you had died just now, I would never have been able to love anyone else." Gaby asks how he could possibly love her after what circumstances had forced her to do, but he says, "Let's forget the terrible things this war made us do."

Cast
 Leslie Caron as Gaby
 John Kerr as Gregory Wendell
 Cedric Hardwicke as Edgar Carrington
 Taina Elg as Elsa
 Margalo Gillmore as Mrs. Carrington
 Scott Marlowe as Jan
 James Best as Jim
 Ruta Lee as Denise
 Gordon Richards as Air Raid Warden

Plot differences
In contrast to the 1931 and 1940 films, Gaby was made after D-Day and the horror of the V-1 attacks on London, and incorporates references to both within its plot. In addition, made post-War, the atmosphere of hopelessness present in 1940 is replaced by an air of optimism.

Production
The film was envisioned as a vehicle for Leslie Caron. The male lead was given to John Kerr, who had become a star on Broadway in Tea and Sympathy and had just made The Cobweb for MGM. Kerr turned down Friendly Persuasion (1956) to take the role in Gaby because the latter was a lead, not a supporting part.

Reception
According to MGM records the film earned $647,000 in the US and Canada and $710,000 elsewhere, resulting in a loss of $1,356,000.

See also
 List of American films of 1956
 Waterloo Bridge (1931)
 Waterloo Bridge (1940)

References

External links
 
 Gaby at TCMDB
 
 

Metro-Goldwyn-Mayer films
American drama films
1956 films
CinemaScope films
American films based on plays
Films directed by Curtis Bernhardt
Films set in London
1956 drama films
Films with screenplays by Charles Lederer
1950s English-language films
1950s American films
English-language drama films